In mathematics, a multiplicative character (or linear character, or simply character) on a group G is a group homomorphism from G to the multiplicative group of a field , usually the field of complex numbers.  If G is any group, then the set Ch(G) of these morphisms forms an abelian group under pointwise multiplication.

This group is referred to as the character group of G. Sometimes only unitary characters are considered (characters whose image is in the unit circle); other such homomorphisms are then called quasi-characters. Dirichlet characters can be seen as a special case of this definition.

Multiplicative characters are linearly independent, i.e. if  are different characters on a group G then from  it follows that

Examples

Consider the (ax + b)-group
 
 Functions fu : G → C such that  where u ranges over complex numbers C are multiplicative characters.

 Consider the multiplicative group of positive real numbers (R+,·). Then functions fu : (R+,·) → C such that fu(a) = au, where a is an element of (R+, ·) and u ranges over complex numbers C, are multiplicative characters.

References
   Lectures Delivered at the University of Notre Dame

Group theory